The Clayton Windmills, known locally as Jack and Jill, stand on the South Downs above the village of Clayton, West Sussex, England. They comprise a post mill and a tower mill, and the roundhouse of a former post mill. All three are Grade II* listed buildings.

Setting and access 
The windmills stand atop the South Downs with views of the Sussex Weald.  They are seven miles north of the city of Brighton and Hove. As well as Jack and Jill, the roundhouse of Duncton Mill survives, located a short distance east of Jack.

The mills are accessible by road at the end of Mill Lane from the A273 road where it crosses the South Downs.  There is free parking in the car park beside the mills.

History of the mills

Duncton Mill

Duncton Mill was built in 1765. It was owned by Viscount Montague and leased for 99 years. Duncton Mill was demolished in 1866, leaving the roundhouse to be used as a store.

Duncton Mill description
Duncton Mill was a post mill with a single storey roundhouse, four Common sails. It was winded by hand and had two pairs of millstones. The Head Wheel from Duncton Mill was used as the Brake Wheel in Jack when that mill was built.

Jill

Jill  is a post mill originally built in Dyke Road,  Brighton, in 1821. It was known as Lashmar's New Mill and was built to replace Lashmar's Old Mill. In 1830, the Windshaft broke, bringing the sails crashing to the ground. A painting by Nash dated 1839 and an engraving in the Handbook to Brighton (1847) show her to have had a roof mounted Fantail, similar to the arrangement still found on Icklesham windmill. Lashmar's New Mill was the most southerly of the three Dyke Road post mills. In 1852 she was moved to Clayton by a team of horses and oxen.  The site is now Belmont—a short street of Grade II-listed villas.

The working life of the mills ended in 1906 and in 1908 Jill was damaged in a storm. She lost her fantail and sails over the years until in 1953 restoration was carried out by E Hole and Son, the Burgess Hill millwrights, funded by Cuckfield Rural District Council. In 1978, restoration of Jill to working order was commenced. Jill ground flour again in 1986. During the Great Storm of 1987, the mill's sails were set in motion with the brake on, setting fire to the mill. Some members of the Windmill Society were able to get to the mill and save her.

Today, Jill is in working order and open to the public most Sundays between May and September. She produces stoneground wholemeal flour on an occasional basis.  The vast majority of her flour is sold to visitors. It is ground from organic wheat, grown locally in Sussex. On the occasions when the wind is blowing and Jill is in operation, a guide is available to explain the process of milling. Jill Windmill is owned by Mid Sussex District Council.

Jill description
Jill is a post mill with a two-storey roundhouse. She has four Patent Sails and is winded by a five blade fantail mounted on the tailpole. The windshaft is wooden, with a cast iron poll end dated 1831. Jill has two pairs of millstones, arranged Head and Tail. The compass arm Tail Wheel shows evidence of having been used as a Brake Wheel at some time. The main Post of Jill is made from four separate pieces of timber, a feature seen in some Sussex post mills and only found in this and Argos Hill Mill today.

Jack

Jack is a five-storey tower mill built in 1866 to replace Duncton Mill. Worked as a pair with Jill, Jack worked until c.1907.  Unusually Jack mill has a male name — almost every other mill in the country is considered female. In 1928, while a pit was being dug for a water tank, an Anglo-Saxon skeleton was discovered. It was later removed to the British Museum. Jack has been owned by barrister Jolyon Maugham since 2013.

Jack description
Jack is a five-storey tower mill with a domed cap. He carries four Patent Sails and was winded by a five blade fantail. There was a stage at first floor level. It is believed that Jack was built by the millwright Cooper, of Henfield. In 1873, Jack was fitted with Hammond's Patent Sweep Governor, a feature also fitted to the post mill at Herstmonceux, which was also run by the Hammonds. Jack had three pairs of millstones, and room for a fourth pair. All machinery below windshaft level has been removed. In 1966, Jack was fitted with new sails as he was to appear in a film. The present owners have lived at the windmill since 2012. The Mill House and Granary were built for them by architect Sarah Featherstone of Featherstone Young in 2016. The Granary retains the historical beams and original footprint of the 18th century granary, while the Mill House is a reconfiguration of Henry Longhurst's house. Together, the buildings connect Jack and Jill windmills on a straight axis, opening up views throughout the site.

Gallery

Millers
Edward Horam 1765 - 1787 (Duncton)
John Geere 1809 (Duncton)
Thomas Hicks 1810 (Duncton)
John Hamlin 1816 (Duncton)
James Mitchell 1838 - 1872 (Duncton, Jack, Jill)
Joseph Hammond 1872 - 1882 (Jack, Jill)
Charles Hammond 1872 - 1905 (Jack, Jill)
Guy 1905 - 1907 (Jack, Jill)

References for above:-

Cultural references 
In summer 1973, Jack and Jill became cinema stars when Universal Pictures made the film The Black Windmill. Actors featured in the film included Michael Caine, Janet Suzman, Donald Pleasence and Joss Ackland.

New sweeps were fitted to Jack for the film, at a cost of £3,000 and the exterior of the mill was repainted. The owner of Jack at the time of the film was Henry Longhurst, golf broadcaster and writer.

The windmills were featured in Series 3 of the Channel 4 programme "Treasure Hunt" first broadcast 31 January 1985.

References

Further reading
 Online version

External links
Windmill World page on Duncton mill.
 Windmill World page on Jack mill.
Hammond's Patent Sweep Governor
 Windmill World page on Jill mill.
Clayton Windmills website

Tourist attractions in West Sussex
Museums in West Sussex
Mill museums in England
Windmills in West Sussex
Grinding mills in the United Kingdom
Post mills in the United Kingdom
Tower mills in the United Kingdom
Windmills completed in 1765
Windmills completed in 1821
Windmills completed in 1866
Buildings and structures demolished in 1865
Grade II* listed buildings in West Sussex